Enrique B. Magalona, officially the Municipality of Enrique B. Magalona , also known simply as E. B. Magalona and formerly known as Saravia, is a 2nd class municipality in the province of Negros Occidental, Philippines. According to the 2020 census, it has a population of 64,290 people.

The municipality is named after Enrique Magalona, former Senator of the Philippines and the grandfather of the late Filipino rap icon Francis Magalona.

The town is also known for the Tomongtong Mangrove Eco-Trail.

Geography

Barangays
Enrique B. Magalona is politically subdivided into 23 barangays.

Climate

Demographics

Economy

See also
List of renamed cities and municipalities in the Philippines

References

External links
 [ Philippine Standard Geographic Code]
Philippine Census Information
Local Governance Performance Management System 

Municipalities of Negros Occidental